Come Home Love  (literally "Love, Return Home") is a Hong Kong sitcom created and produced by TVB. Premiering on TVB Jade on May 14, 2012, the series was originally intended for 180 episodes but extended multiple times, before finally concluding in July 2015 with a total of 804 episodes. The was broadcast on TVB Jade and HD Jade every Monday through Friday during its 8:00-8:30 pm timeslot.

In February 2015, TVB announced plans to end the series so the cast and production team could move on to other projects. However, the series' positive ratings led to a spin-off series with a whole new cast and production team. The spinoff series was first broadcast on July 6, 2015, with the only returning cast members being Lai Lok-yi, Max Cheung, Griselda Yeung and Geoffrey Wong, who play minor roles in the second series.

In 2020, the cast received the Lifetime Achievement Award at the 2020 TVB Anniversary Awards.

Synopsis
The series revolves around the Ma family, an extended Chinese family living together in modern Hong Kong. The story also extends to the law firm youngest son John (Ma Chaung) works at.

Ma Fu (Lau Dan), is a retired Hong Kong Correctional Services officer. He is the patriarch of the Ma family and his traditional and disciplinarian approach to life creates both friction and solutions. The other members of the family are his much younger sister Ma Yau (Florence Kwok); second son and daughter-in-law, Ma Keung (Tsui Wing) and Lo Lai Sheung (Yvonne Lam); the deceased eldest son's Ma Gin's, children Ma Tse Yan (Joey Law) and Ma Tse Nei (Angel Chiang); and youngest son Ma Chuang (Lai Lok-yi).

Cast

Main cast
Lau Dan as Ma Fu (馬虎)
Head of the Ma family
Tsui Wing as Ma Keung (馬強) & Ma Gin (馬健)
Fu's second son, married to Lai Sheung. Also adopted his deceased older brother's two kids, "Leslie" Tse Yan and "Tracy" Tse Nei.
Yvonne Lam as Diana Lo Lai Sheung (勞麗嫦)
Keung's wife and adopted mother to Tse Yan and Tse Nei, and a wedding planner.
Lai Lok-yi as John Ma Chong (馬壯)
Fu's youngest son, a legal executive, later lawyer.
Florence Kwok as Angel Ma Yau (馬柔)
Fu's much younger sister, a coffee brewer and secret shopper.
Carlo Ng as Jacky Leung Yin Fun (梁彥芬)
A Ma family friend and bakery manager in Macao, childhood friend of Angel.
Angel Chiang as Tracy Ma Tse Nei (馬子妮)
Fu's granddaughter by his eldest son, a college student; she eventually works as a clerk at a law firm and as an amateur jewelry maker.
Joey Law as Leslie Ma Tse Yan (馬子仁)
Fu's grandson by his eldest son, a fashion designer.
Queenie Chu as Alex Wan Tak Yu (尹德如)
A barrister and John’s superior, later his girlfriend.
Geoffrey Wong as Damon Cha Ka Sak (查嘉澤)
John's boss. He owns his own law firm.
Glen Lee as Anthony Lau Sheung Yau (樓尚友)
Alex’s colleague and protege, Amanda's younger brother.
Max Cheung as Richard Yim Gan (嚴謹)
A barrister. Eventually marries Fung Yin Ha.
Griselda Yeung as Fung Yin Ha (馮嫣霞)
A barrister. Has a son from a previous marriage.  Eventually marries Richard.
Steve Lee as Leung Wing Hung (梁永洪)
Ma Keung's employee at the store.
Lisa Chong as Heung Ching (向晴)
A legal clerk at the law firm
Yeewan Ho as Maggie Koon May Kei (管美琪)
Damon Cha's personal secretary at the law firm.
Raymond Chiu as Chung Biu (鍾標)
Ma Keung's former classmate.
Celine Ma as So Bik (蘇碧)
A bartender at PushUp Bar.
William Chu as Lee Chi Sing (李志成)
A legal executive and John's co-worker at the law firm.  Si-Si's older brother.
Auston Lam as Soeng Goon Fei (上官飛)
Ma Keung's employee at the store and a street performer who wants to be a singer.

Main recurring cast

Eileen Yeow as Amanda Lau Seung Ho (樓尚好)
Oceane Zhu as Sam Shiu Ching (岑水清)
Helen Ma as Wan Suk Han (溫淑嫻)
Kenny Wong as Eric Kau Nga Wik (裘亞域)
Roxanne Tong as Lee Si Si (李思思)
Jimmy Au as K.C. Liu Kai Chung (廖啟聰)
Candice Chiu as Angel Liu Tung (呂瞳)
Eddie Law as Wong Mau Dang (黄茂登)
Katy Kung as Gem Kau Ah-Yuk (裘亞鈺)
Matt Yeung as Jaden To Ngo Hang (任我行)
Tim Cheng as Sau Wan Hoi (守雲開)
Jerry Ku as Gino Bat Fan (畢凡)
Samantha Ko as Lovely Ling Lei (凌俐)
Owen Cheung as Ken Song Lai Kan (宋禮勤)
Brian Tse as Alan Kei Wing Lun (祁詠倫)
Jennifer Shum as San Ting Yee (申靜宜)
Kayi Cheung as Isabella Leung Sai Yi (梁茜伊)
Chow Chung as Chan Chung (陳聰)
Eunis Sin as Chan Siu Nam (陳小楠)

Yat-Fei Lau as Cou Zong (曹總)

Extended cast

Wendy Hon as Choi Suk Gwan (蔡淑君)
Claire Yiu as Ming Lee Mau Guen (李美娟)
Chloe Nguyen as Pinky Ko Sau Ping (高秀蘋)
Pauline Chow as Nicole Lai Chi Ling (賴芝玲)
Kim Li as Terry Cheng Chi May (程志美)
Kayee Tam as Situ Yun (司徒韻) ("V仔")
Lily Leung as Laura Tsang-Lee Kap Kwan (李曾合群)
Teresa Ha as Judy Ha-Yee Ho Ying (施夏浩縈)
Ho Chun Hin as Haywood Chiu
Kimmy Kwan as Samantha
Rosella Lau as Ling Ko Nong (高寧)
Lucy Li as Winnie
Ip Ting Chi as Paula
Gloria Chan as Mazie
Ivana Wong as Emma Chu Oi Ma (朱愛瑪)
Ricky Wong as Liu Mo (雷武)
Nicole Wan as Heidi
Snow Suen as Apple
Kathy Fung as Tammy
Candy Yuen as Lemon
Doris Chow as Cherry
Nicole Leung as Cherry #2
Mandy Ho as Lily
Annie Chong as Eva Lam
Chiu Lok Yin as Andrew
Andy Lau Tin Lung as Ben
Hugo Wong as Calvin Ho
So Lai Ming as Dora Wong
Albert Cheung as Eric Cheung
Esther Wan as Joyce
Albert Law as Ka Tak Sik (賈德積)
Christy Chan as Caty
Helen Seng as Mandy
Judy Tsang as Jamie & Gigi
Wong Hong Kiu as Kiu (翹)
Kimmi Tsui as Joey
Alex Tse as Tyson
Sam Tsang as Gilbert
Julian Gaertner as Ronald
Chuk Man Kwan as Manager Lo (魯經理)
Kelvin Lee as Ching (青)
Joey Mak as Amy
Kanice Lau as Becky
Vicky Chan as Carrie Lam
Joseph Yeung as Andy Lo
Jayden Kau as Brad
Desmond Pang as Calvin Si
Argus Ip as Tai (泰)
Jacky Lei as Wah (華)
Kelvin Yuen as Wah #2 (華第二)
Kong Wing Fai as Leung Yin Chung (梁彥昌)
Even Chan as Wing
Shally Tsang as Paula Chan Bou Lai (陳寶拉)
Sunny Tai as Morning Chan Ciu Jo (陳朝早)
Louis Cheung

Joyce Tang as Yu Sing Nam (余勝男)

Music

Opening theme

Sub themes

Development

The costume fitting ceremony was held on March 7, 2012, at 12:30 pm Tseung Kwan O TVB City Studio One. Original cast attendance included Lau Dan, Tsui Wing, Lai Lok Yi, Florence Kwok, Yvonne Lam, Joey Law, Angel Chiang, Queenie Chu, Carlo Ng, Yvonne Ho, Max Cheung, William Chu, Griselda Yeung, Lisa Ch'ng, Wong Chun Tong, Raymond Chiu, Lee Ka Ting, Auston Lam, Celine Ma, Jenny Lau, Apple Chan, Cheung Yin Chak, Hero Yuen, William Chak, and Hebe Chan.
The series was originally intended to have 180 episodes. Due to solid ratings, TVB extended the series to 300 episodes in January 2013.
Also in January 2013, Oceane Zhu whose character was originally a cameo was promoted to main cast due to her character being well received by audiences.
With continued solid ratings and urging by audiences, TVB ordered an additional 200 episodes in May 2013. Totaling 500 episodes, the cast and crew held a banquet to celebrate the milestone.
After extended the series multiple times because of solid ratings, TVB announced in February 2015 that they are planning to finally conclude the series even though the series is still doing well in the ratings.
TVB originally planned to have certain cast members and the production crew collaborate again in a new sitcom series. Plans were scrapped, Instead a spin-off series with a whole new cast and crew was created. The second series retains the Come Home Love title, but will not have any major connections to the first series. Chris Lai, Max Cheung, Griselda Yeung and Geoffrey Wong are the only cast members to resume their characters in the second series. They will be playing minor roles in the new series.
A promo image of Come Home Love was one of twelve series featured in TVB's 2015 calendar for the month of February.

Viewership ratings

: Episode 51 (July 23, 2012) peaked at 38 points as a result of a Typhoon Vicente.

* Episodes were not broadcast on:'*2012 - October 1, October 8, November 19, December 17*2013 - February 11, October 4, November 19, December 16,December 20*2014 - January 17, January 31, October 20,  November 19, December 15*2015 - February 19, February 20

International broadcast

See also
Come Home Love 2

References

External links
Come Home Love Official Website 
K-TVB.net

TVB dramas
2012 Hong Kong television series debuts
2015 Hong Kong television series endings
Hong Kong television sitcoms